The Ford Forty-Nine was a concept car created by the Ford Motor Company. It was designed by Chip Foose and was first introduced at the 2001 North American International Auto Show. It is a tribute to the 1949 Ford. A convertible was also built, finished in red, but it was a static display vehicle and as such had no running gear.

Engine and Design
The Forty-Nine's engine was the same Jaguar AJ-V8 engine used in the Ford Thunderbird, a naturally aspirated 3.9 liter, DOHC, 32-valve V8. Power is sent to the rear wheels through a 5-speed automatic transmission.

References

Notes
2001 Ford 49 Info from ConceptCarz.com

Forty-Nine
Retro-style automobiles